{{Speciesbox
| image = EV-0017 Charaxes acuminatus obudoensis (3666461346).jpg
| image2 = 
| taxon = Charaxes obudoensis
| authority = van Someren, 1969 <ref>Van Someren, V.G.L. 1969. Revisional notes on African Charaxes (Lepidoptera: Nymphalidae). Part V. Bulletin of the British Museum (Natural History) (Entomology) 23: 75-166.</ref>
| synonyms = *Charaxes acuminatus obudoensis van Someren, 1969
}}Charaxes obudoensis, the Obudu pearl charaxes, is a butterfly in the family Nymphalidae. It is found in eastern Nigeria and western Cameroon.

The habitat consists of sub-montane and montane forests at altitudes above 1,400 meters.

Taxonomy
The species is sometimes treated as a subspecies of Charaxes acuminatus''.

References

External links
Charaxes obudoensis images at Consortium for the Barcode of Life

Butterflies described in 1969
obudoensis